Count Adolf Andreas Woldemar Freedericksz (1 July 1927) was a Finno-Russian statesman who served as Imperial Household Minister between 1897 and 1917 under Nicholas II.  He was responsible for the administration of the Imperial family's personal affairs and living arrangements, as well as the awarding of Imperial honours and medals.

Biography

Family

There had been several stories dedicated to the family's origin. The first was that the family probably originated from Arkhangelsk. Jürgen Freedericksz, who was a Dutch merchant, was the first ever recorded ancestor of the family, and the family was recordedly formed by his son, Johan (Ivan Yuryevich) Freedericksz. The baronial title of the family was granted by Catherine the Great in 1773. The second version was that the family was formed by the son of Jöran Fredriksson, a Swedish soldier captured during The Great Northern War. In the late 18th century, the Freedericksz family dominated in the fiefs given to them in what was later to be known as Old Finland. In 1853, Woldemar's father Bernhard was naturalized into the Finnish House of Nobility as the baronial family number 36 under the name Freedricksz. Upon Woldemar Freedericksz's death in 1927 the Finnish baronial family was extinct in the male line, and was completely extinct by the time of the deaths of Woldemar's daughters Eugenie and Emma. His Russian comital title was never accepted into the Finnish nobility. Woldemar himself married to Hedwig Johanna Alexandrina (Jadwiga Aloizievna) Boguszewska and had two daughters, Baronesses Eugenie Valeria Josefina (Evgenia-Valentina-Zhozefina Vladimirovna) and Emma Helena Sofia (Emma-Elena-Sofia Vladimirovna) Freedericksz.

Career
As the part of a wealthy family, Freedericksz received home education at an early age. Succeeding Count Vorontsov-Daskov at the Ministry at the age of 60, Freedericksz established a close relationship with the Tsar and the Tsaritsa, calling them 'mes enfants' in private. He was praised in this role by the French ambassador, Maurice Paléologue, who called him 'the very personification of court life'. However, in later life, he became forgetful and ill and often fell asleep during conferences. Freedericksz was a strong conservative who described the deputies of the First Duma as: "The Deputies, they give one the impression of a gang of criminals who are only waiting for the signal to throw themselves upon the ministers and cut their throats. I will never again set foot among those people."

Later life

His private mansion in St. Petersburg was pillaged and set on fire on the first day of February Revolution. After the Revolution, Freedericksz lived in Petrograd before being allowed in 1925 to leave for Finland, where he spent the last years of his life.

Honours and awards

Russian orders and decorations
 Knight of St. Stanislaus, 2nd Class, 30 August 1869; 1st Class, 15 May 1883
 Knight of St. Vladimir, 4th Class, 30 August 1873; 3rd Class, 19 February 1880; 2nd Class, 30 August 1889; 1st Class, 6 December 1906
 Knight of St. Anna, 2nd Class, 26 August 1876; 1st Class, 30 August 1886
 Knight of the White Eagle, 2 April 1895
 Knight of St. Alexander Nevsky, 1 January 1899
 Knight of St. Andrew, 25 March 1908

Medals
 Medal "In Memory of the War of 1853-1856"
 Medal "In Memory of the Coronation of Emperor Alexander III"
 Medal "In Memory of the Coronation of Emperor Nicholas II"
 Medal "In Memory of the Reign of Emperor Alexander III"
 Medal of the Red Gross "In Memory of the Russo-Japanese War" (1906)
 Medal "In Memory of the Russo-Japanese War" (1906)
 Medal "In Memory of the 200th Anniversary of the Battle of Poltava"

Foreign orders and decorations

Cultural depictions 
He was portrayed in the 1971 film Nicholas and Alexandra by Jack Hawkins. In 1983, he was portrayed by Vsevolod Safonov in the 1983 film Anna Pavlova directed by Emil Loteanu.
He was also portrayed in 1997's Anastasia as Woldemar.

References

Sources 

 Out of My Past: The Memoirs of Count Kokovtsov Edited by H.H. Fisher and translated by Laura Matveev; Stanford University Press, 1935.

 Margarita Nelipa (2015) Servant to Three Emperors: Count Vladimir Frederiks. In: Royal Russia Annual No. 7.
 Freedericksz (Russian)
 Born a statesman, Minister of the Imperial Count Vladimir Borisovich Frederiks (Russian)

Counts of the Russian Empire
Members of the State Council (Russian Empire)
Government ministers of Russia
1837 births
1927 deaths
Politicians of the Russian Empire
Monarchists from the Russian Empire
White Russian emigrants to Finland
Recipients of the Order of Saint Stanislaus (Russian), 1st class
Recipients of the Order of St. Anna, 1st class
Recipients of the Order of St. Vladimir, 1st class
Recipients of the Order of the White Eagle (Russia)
Grand Crosses of the Order of Saint Stephen of Hungary
Grand Crosses of the Order of the Dannebrog
Grand Croix of the Légion d'honneur
Honorary Knights Grand Cross of the Royal Victorian Order
Commanders Grand Cross of the Order of the Sword